Xestia is a genus of noctuid moths (family Noctuidae). They are the type genus of the tribe Xestiini in subfamily Noctuinae, though some authors merge this tribe with the Noctuini. Species in this genus are commonly known as "clays", "darts" or "rustics", but such names are commonplace among Noctuidae. Xestia moths have a wide distribution, though they most prominently occur in the Holarctic.

With almost 200 species included at one time, Xestia was something of a "wastebin genus". But almost half of the traditional species are now placed elsewhere (see below), and some of the remaining ones are liable to be assigned to another genus also. On the other hand, new moths that probably do belong in this genus are still being discovered (e.g. X. hypographa, which led to the 2002 transfer of X. ornata from Eugraphe to here). Thus, unless there are drastic taxonomic changes in the future, Xestia is likely to remain one of the larger noctuine genera.

Ecology
Xestia adults are usually of medium size and robust build, with stout hairy bodies and strong wings. Some are quite colorful, with bold lighter markings and hindwings in delicate yellowish, reddish or bluish hues. Generally, they are cryptic while at rest however, with unmarked pale or dull brownish hindwings; they do not have metallic hues and few species possess obvious eyespots.

This genus includes many species living at high latitudes and altitudes, in tundra and taiga ecosystems. Some have two-year (semivoltine) life cycles and only occur as adults every other year; typically the caterpillar larva overwinters to pupate in spring, with the moths flying around midsummer, but some species eclose later, their moths flying from late summer into autumn. Xestia caterpillars are generally stout and cryptically colored; in some species they have quite prominent dark lengthwise spots, but may e.g. be entirely green or whatever else gives best camouflage.

Some species' larvae are notoriously polyphagous, e.g. the setaceous Hebrew character (X. c-nigrum), the food of which includes all sorts of core eudicots – including solanaceae and others which are poisonous to many herbivores – as well as some monocots. The latter are mainly Poaceae however, and few other monocots are utilized by Xestia larvae in general. Ericaceae, as well as Betulaceae and Poaceae, are key food plants for many of the high-latitude species. Gymnosperms are food plants of secondary importance in this genus, but Pinaceae form the mainstay or exclusive food of some species which occasionally become more than nuisance pests. Altogether, Xestia moths are only known as major pests within limited areas or in regard to specific plants, in which cases damage can be economically significant though.

Even though the larval food plants of many Xestia species are not or insufficiently known, those on record are from all major lineages of core eudicots. Among the basal core eudicots, Caryophyllales (especially Polygonaceae) are particularly significant, of the asterids the Asterales (especially Asteraceae), Ericales (especially Ericaceae) and Lamiales (especially Plantaginaceae), and of the rosids the Malpighiales (numerous families) and Rosales (especially Rosaceae). Less important asterid orders among Xestia food plants are for example Dipsacales, Gentianales and Solanales, of the rosids e.g. Fabales, Fagales, Malvales, Myrtales and Sapindales. More basal (mes)angiosperms do not seem to be significant as Xestia food plants, at least not in temperate and cooler regions.

As far as is known, Xestia adults are nocturnal or crepuscular (except of course the high-latitude species), but are often attracted to lights at night. They general feed on flowers with relatively short or no corolla, and will also drink other sugary liquids.

Systematics and taxonomy
Several species formerly placed here are now in Agnorisma and Pseudohermonassa; whether other genera are accepted varies among authors; Estimata, Hemigraphiphora and Perinaenia are provisionally considered distinct here. "Xestia" versuta does not seem to belong in the present genus; it may be an aberrant member of Goniographa, but until this is resolved it is here treated under its original name Eugraphe versuta.

Furthermore, a case for separation has in particular been made for Amathes (possibly including Agrotiphila), Lytaea, Megasema (possibly including Megarhomba), Segetia and Schoyenia (with Archanarta occasionally also separate), but these are here included in Xestia. Some of them are, however, recognized as subgenera, and if the genus is split further would be first to become elevated in rank again. There is no real good justification for either treatment, except that the lengthy process of a thorough revision of noctuine systematics and taxonomy has only progressed so far. H. Beck in 1996 published a comprehensive taxonomic catalogue, introducing generic names for most European groups of (presumably) related species. While few of these seem to stand any chance ever to be widely recognized as distinct genera, this step is likely to have made available a generic name for any taxa that are eventually split from Xestia sensu stricto.

Synonyms

Junior synonyms and other obsolete generic names for Xestia moths are:

 Agrotimorpha Barnes & Benjamin, 1929
 Agrotiphila Grote, 1876
 Amathes Hübner, [1821]
 Anomogyna Staudinger, 1871
 Archanarta Barnes & Benjamin, 1929
 Ashworthia Beck, 1996
 Asworthia (lapsus)
 Barrovia Barnes & McDunnough, 1916
 Calamogyna (lapsus)
 Calanomogyna Beck, 1996
 Calocestia (lapsus)
 Caloxestia Beck, 1996
 Castanasta Beck, 1996
 Cenigria Beck, 1996
 Epipsiliamorpha Barnes & Benjamin, 1929
 Ericathia Beck, 1996
 Hiptelia Guenée, 1852
 Hypoxestia Hampson, 1903
 Hyptioxesta Rebel, 1901
 Knappia Nye, 1975
 Lankialaia Beck, 1996
 Lena Herz, 1903 (non Casey, 1886 preoccupied)
 Litaea (lapsus)
 Lorezea (lapsus)
 Lorezia Beck, 1996
 Lytaea Stephens, 1829
 Megarhomba Beck, 1996
 Megasema Hübner, [1821]
 Monticollia Beck, 1996
 Pachnobia Guenée, 1852
 Palaeamathes Boursin, 1964
 Paramathes Boursin, 1964
 Palkermes Beck, 1996
 Palkkermes (lapsus)
 Peranomogyna Beck, 1996
 Platagrotis Smith, 1890
 Pteroscia Morrison, 1875
 Schoyenia Aurivillius, 1883
 Segetia Stephens, 1829
 Synanomogyna Beck, 1996
 Xenopachnobia Beck, 1996

Species
The 110 or so species here placed in Xestia are divided among five subgenera. Two of these are further divided into groups, which are based on phenetic similarity however and may or may not form clades and/or species complexes. Some of these would presumably warrant recognition as subgenera if the present-day subgenera are split off; the subgeneric names that would apply are given (if known) in the addition to the species-group names.

About one-third of the species here included in Xestia are incertae sedis (of unclear assignment). Among this group are a few species which are extremely little known, having been described long ago but studied only once or twice since then.

Subgenus Anomogyna

 Xestia albuncula (Eversmann, 1851)
 Xestia alpicola – northern dart (type of Xenopachnobia)
 Xestia badicollis – northern variable dart, northern conifer dart, white pine cutworm (possibly belongs in X. elimata)
 Xestia borealis (Nordström, 1933)
 Xestia brunneopicta (Matsumura, 1925)
 Xestia caelebs
 Xestia dilucida – dull reddish dart, reddish heath dart
 Xestia distensa (Eversmann, 1851) (sometimes in X. laetabilis)
 Xestia elimata – southern variable dart, variable climbing caterpillar
 Xestia fabulosa (Ferguson, 1965)
 Xestia fennica (Brandt, 1936)
 Xestia gelida (Sparre-Schneider, 1883) (type of Peranomogyna)

 Xestia imperita (Hübner, [1831])
 Xestia infimatis Grote, 1880 (tentatively placed here, may belong in subgenus Xestia)
 Xestia laetabilis (Zetterstedt, [1839]) (type of Anomogyna)
 Xestia mustelina Smith, 1900
 Xestia perquiritata – boomerang dart
 Xestia praevia (possibly belongs in X. elimata)
 Xestia rhaetica (type of Synanomogyna)
 Xestia sincera (type of Calanomogyna)
 Xestia speciosa (type of Platagrotis)
 Xestia vernilis Grote, 1879
 Xestia viridiscens (Turati, 1919) (sometimes in X. speciosa)
 Xestia yatsugadakeana (Matsumura, 1926)

Subgenus Megasema

ashworthii/"Ashworthia" group
 Xestia ashworthii – Ashworth's rustic (type of Ashworthia)
 Xestia okakensis Packard, 1867
 Xestia okakensis okakensis Packard, 1867
 Xestia okakensis morandi (Benjamin, 1934) (sometimes considered distinct species)
 Xestia scropulana Morrison, 1874 (formerly in X. wockei)
 Xestia wockei
kollari group
 Xestia kollari

c-nigrum group
 Xestia c-nigrum – setaceous Hebrew character, "spotted cutworm" (type of Cenigria)
 Xestia ditrapezium – triple-spotted clay
 Xestia dolosa – greater black-letter dart, woodland spotted cutworm, "spotted cutworm"
 Xestia praetermissa Warren (possibly belongs in X. c-nigrum)
 Xestia triangulum – double square-spot (type of Megasema)
Species group unknown
 Xestia inuitica Lafontaine & Hensel, 1998

Subgenus Pachnobia

 Xestia alaskae (type of Epipsiliamorpha; tentatively placed here, may belong in subgenus Schoyenia)
 Xestia atrata (Morrison, 1875) (type of Pteroscia)
 Xestia atrata atrata (Morrison, 1874)
 Xestia atrata filipjevi (Shljuzhko, 1926)
 Xestia atrata haraldi Fibiger, 1997

 Xestia atrata ursae (McDunnough, 1940)
 Xestia atrata yukona (McDunnough, 1921)
 Xestia kolymae (Herz, 1903)
 Xestia kruegeri Kononenko & Schmitz, 2004
 Xestia laxa Lafontaine & Mikkola, 1998
 Xestia lorezi (type of Lorezia)
 Xestia lupa Lafontaine & Mikkola, 1998
 Xestia penthima (Erschoff, 1870) (type of Hyptioxesta)
 Xestia tecta (Hübner, [1808]) (type of Pachnobia)
 Xestia tecta tecta (Hübner, [1808])
 Xestia tecta tectoides (Corti, 1926)

Subgenus Schoyenia

 Xestia aequaeva (Benjamin, 1934)
 Xestia aequaeva aequaeva (Benjamin, 1934)
 Xestia aequaeva glaucina Lafontaine & Mikkola, 1996
 Xestia brachiptera (Kononenko, 1981)
 Xestia bryanti (Benjamin, 1933) (= X. acraea)
 Xestia fergusoni Lafontaine, 1983
 Xestia intermedia (Kononenko, 1981)
 Xestia liquidaria (Eversmann, 1848) (= X. arctica Aurivillius, 1883 (non Zetterstedt, 1839: preoccupied), X. fasciata, X. unifasciata; type of Schoyenia)

 Xestia lyngei (Rebel, 1923) (type of Lankialaia)
 Xestia lyngei lyngei (Rebel, 1923)
 Xestia lyngei aborigenea Kononenko, 1983
 Xestia lyngei lankialai (Grönblom, 1962))
 Xestia magadanensis Kononenko & Lafontaine, 1983
 Xestia quieta (type of Archanarta)
 Xestia similis Kononenko 1981
 Xestia thula Lafontaine & Kononenko, 1983
 Xestia woodi Lafontaine & Kononenko, 1983

Subgenus Xestia

baja/"Amathes" group
 Xestia baja – dotted clay (type of Amathes)
 Xestia smithii – Smith's dart (possibly belongs in X. baja)
castanea/"Castanasta/Ericathia" group
 Xestia agathina – heath rustic (type of Ericathia)
 Xestia castanea – grey rustic, The Neglected (type of Castanasta)
 Xestia jordani (Turati, 1912)
collina/"Monticollia" group
 Xestia collina (type of Monticollia)
ochreago group
 Xestia ochreago
sexstrigata/"Lytaea" group
 Xestia sexstrigata – six-striped rustic (type of Lytaea)
stigmatica/"Megarhomba" group (= "rhomboidea group", misidentification)
 Xestia sareptana
 Xestia stigmatica – square-spotted clay (type of Megarhomba)
trifida/"Caloxestia" group
 Xestia trifida (type of Caloxestia)

xanthographa/"Segetia" group
 Xestia cohaesa
 Xestia kermesina (Mabille, 1869) (type of Palkermes)
 Xestia kermesina kermesina (Mabille, 1869)

 Xestia kermesina virescens Turati, 1912
 Xestia palaestinensis
 Xestia xanthographa – square-spot rustic (type of Segetia)
Species group unknown
 Xestia badinosis (Grote, 1874)
 Xestia bolteri
 Xestia cinerascens (Smith, 1891)
 Xestia conchis
 Xestia dyris (Zerny, 1934) (tentatively placed here)
 Xestia finatimis Lafontaine, 1998
 Xestia fuscostigma (Bremer, 1861)
 Xestia lithoplana Hreblay & Ronkay 1998
 Xestia mejiasi Pinker, 1961
 Xestia normaniana – Norman's dart
 Xestia oblata (Morrison, 1875)
 Xestia substrigata (Smith, 1895)
 Xestia verniloides Lafontaine, 1998

Incertae sedis

If the affiliations of the subgenera are not very much mistaken, most remaining cases of erroneous assignment to Xestia are to be found among the species of uncertain group affiliation here; for the recently described X. kecskerago for example it was explicitly stated that placement in the present genus is tentative. Other species of unclear affiliation are so little known that even their validity remains questionable, though this group equally well seems to contain quite distinct lineages of true Xestia. Also, there are some obvious species groups which do not easily fit into the subgeneric scheme above.

"Agrotiphila" group
 Xestia colorado (Smith, 1891) (type of Agrotiphila)
 Xestia maculata (Smith, 1893)
 Xestia staudingeri (type of Agrotimorpha)
"Hypoxestia" group
 Xestia dilatata (Butler, 1879) (type of Hypoxestia)
ornata group
 Xestia hypographa
 Xestia ornata (formerly in Eugraphe)
"Palaeamathes" group
 Xestia hoenei (Boursin, 1954) (type of Palaeamathes)
"Paramathes" group
 Xestia perigrapha (Püngeler, 1899) (type of Paramathes)
retracta/tenuis group
 Xestia basistriga Yoshimoto, 1995
 Xestia bifurcata Hreblay & Ronkay, 1998
 Xestia coronata Hacker & Peks, 1999
 Xestia destituta (Leech, 1900)
 Xestia forsteri Boursin, 1964
 Xestia hemitragidia (Boursin 1964)
 Xestia nyei Plante, 1979 (= X. longijuxta)
 Xestia retracta
 Xestia schaeferi Hreblay & Ronkay, 1998
 Xestia semiretracta Yoshimoto, 1995
 Xestia subforsteri Hreblay, & Ronkay 1998
 Xestia tenuis (Butler 1889)
 Xestia trifurcata Hacker & Peks, 1999

"Yellow hindwings" group
 Xestia bryocharis Boursin, 1948
 Xestia draesekei Boursin, 1948
 Xestia efflorescens
 Xestia flavilinea Wileman, 1912
 Xestia pseudoaccipiter Boursin, 1948
 Xestia semiherbida (Walker, 1857)
 Xestia sternecki Boursin, 1948
 Xestia triphaenoides Boursin, 1948
Species group unknown
 Xestia agalma (Püngeler, 1900)
 Xestia albifurca (Erschoff, [1877])
 Xestia cervina (Moore, 1867)
 Xestia consanguinea (Moore, 1881)
 Xestia costaestriga (Staudinger, 1895)
 Xestia crassipuncta (Wileman & West, 1928)
 Xestia homochroma (Hampson 1903)
 Xestia isochroma (Hampson 1903)
 Xestia isolata
 Xestia junctura (Moore, 1881)
 Xestia kecskerago Gyulai & L.Ronkay, 2006
 Xestia latinigra (Prout, 1928)
 Xestia mandarina (Leech, 1900)
 Xestia olivascens (Hampson, 1894)
 Xestia renalis
 Xestia rosifunda (Dyar, 1916)
 Xestia senescens (Staudinger, 1881) (formerly in Eugraphe)
 Xestia tamsi (Wileman & West, 1929)
 Xestia vidua (Staudinger, 1892)
 Xestia yamanei Chang, 1991

Footnotes

References
  (1996): Systematische Liste der Noctuidae Europas. (Lepidoptera, Noctuidae) ["Systematic list of European Noctuidae"]. Neue Entomologische Nachrichten 36: 1-122.
  (2004): Butterflies and Moths of the World, Generic Names and their Type-species – Xestia. Version of 5 November 2004. Retrieved 18 January 2011.
  (2009): Lepidoptera and Some Other Life Forms – Xestia. Version of 31 December 2009. Retrieved 18 January 2011.
  (2003): A revision of the Palaearctic species of the Eugraphe Hübner, [1821] 1816 generic complex. Part I. The genera Eugraphe and Goniographa (Lepidoptera, Noctuidae). (PDF) Acta Zoologica Academiae Scientiarum Hungaricae 48(4): 333–374.

 
Noctuoidea genera
Taxa named by Jacob Hübner